The Story of the Trapp Family Singers is a 1949 memoir written by Maria Augusta von Trapp, whose life was later fictionalized in Rodgers and Hammerstein's Broadway musical The Sound of Music in 1959.

Background
Maria never intended to write anything of her life. However, a friend persistently pleaded with her not to allow her story to be forgotten by others.  Though she denied she had any writing skill whatsoever, her friend was not to be put off and kept on asking her whenever they saw each other.  Finally, one day, in desperation, Maria excused herself and went to her room for an hour to scribble a few pages about her life story, hoping to prove once and for all she was no writer.  However, this displayed such natural writing talent that she reluctantly agreed to finish what she had started, and her jottings formed the basis of the first chapter of her memoirs. Her book, The Story of the Trapp Family Singers, was a best-seller. The book was published in 1949 by J. B. Lippincott Company of Philadelphia, Pennsylvania.

Storyline
The book describes the life of the von Trapp family, from their beginnings in Salzburg, Austria, to their adventures in America where they escaped from Nazi-invaded Europe. The story reflects on family tragedies, victories, and the kindness of strangers who soon became friends to the young family.

Adaptations
Die Trapp-Familie (The Trapp Family), 1956 film
Die Trapp-Familie in Amerika (The Trapp Family in America), 1958 film
The Sound of Music, 1959 stage musical; also see several other stage adaptations in this article
The Sound of Music, 1965 film starring Julie Andrews and Christopher Plummer
Trapp Ikka Monogatari (Trapp Family Story), 1991 animated TV series, part of World Masterpiece Theater
The Sound of Music Live!, 2013 live television production starring Carrie Underwood
The Sound of Music Live, 2015 live television production starring Kara Tointon
Sarigama, 2016 Sinhala musical film written and directed by Somaratne Dissanayake 
The Sound of Music,* 2017 Innovative Arts stage musical

Differences between the book and the musicals
Maria married Georg von Trapp in 1927, not 1938 as portrayed in the musical. She initially fell in love with the children rather than the father and only later came to love him. The father was not the aloof patriarch who disapproved of music but a warm gentle-hearted parent. They also left Austria openly by train instead of secretly at night. 

They first performed in the Salzburg Festival in 1936, not 1938 as portrayed in the musical, and not as a ruse to give them more time to make their escape as portrayed in the musical. The musical telescopes many events and a long time frame into fewer events and a very short space of time. By the time the family left Austria in real life in 1938, two more children had been born and a third was on the way. In the musical, only the original seven children are portrayed, and Maria and Georg have only been married for one month when they and the seven children leave Austria.

The children's names and ages are different in the musical and there is no exact equivalent for each child, although some of the children in the musical seem similar to the ones in the book. Liesl, the fictional oldest daughter in the musical, is for the most part an invention of fiction, and certainly Rolf, the messenger boy with a romantic interest in Liesl, has no known equivalent in the family's real life situation. The younger children were probably at least partly inspired by the family's real children but this does not necessarily imply any direct link between any particular fictional child and any particular actual child.

EditionThe Story of the Trapp Family Singers'',  (Doubleday 1990).

References

External links
The Real Story of the von Trapp Family (from the US National Archives)

1949 non-fiction books
Autobiographies adapted into films
Trapp family
Music autobiographies
J. B. Lippincott & Co. books
The Sound of Music